The following lists events that happened during 2015 in Panama.

Incumbents
President: Juan Carlos Varela
Vice President: Isabel Saint Malo

Events

January
 January 2 – The Panama-owned MV Better Trans cargo ship sprang a leak and foundered in the Philippine Sea with the loss of one of her nineteen crew.

References

 
Panama
2010s in Panama
Years of the 21st century in Panama
Panama